Dalhousie, Nallathanniya or Delhousie is a village in Nuwara Eliya District, Sri Lanka. The place is situated en route to Adam's Peak. The village borrowed its name from a nearby tea estate.

See also
Locations in Sri Lanka with a Scottish name

Populated places in Nuwara Eliya District